Richard Cambridge may refer to:
Richard Cambridge (actor) (born 1977), British actor
Richard Cambridge (poet), American poet
Richard Owen Cambridge (1717–1802), British poet